Windaroo is a residential  suburb in the outer southern areas of the City of Logan, Queensland, Australia.

Geography
The suburb is bounded to the north by Windaroo Creek, to the east by the Albert River, to the south by Bannockburn Road, and to the west by Beaudesert–Beenleigh Road.

History
The suburb was named and bounded on 1 June 1981.

Windaroo State School opened on 28 January 1992. It is now within neighbouring Mount Warren Park.

Windaroo Valley State High School opened on 1 January 1994. It is now within neighbouring Bahrs Scrub.

On Sunday 29 October 2000, the Windaroo Australian Peace Keepers Memorial was dedicated to military personnel and civilians who had served in Australia's peace-keeping missions.

Until 2008, Windaroo was within the local government area of City of Gold Coast. However, local government boundary changes in 2008 transferred suburbs north of the Albert River (including Windaroo) into the City of Logan, even though a plebiscite held in 2007 found 2,534 residents supported the change while 10,821 were opposed. 

The median age of the Windaroo population was 36 years, 1 year below the national median of 37. 70.6% of people living in Windaroo were born in Australia. The other top responses for country of birth were England 8.9%, New Zealand 7.4%, South Africa 1.1%, Scotland 0.8%, Ireland 0.6%. 91.2% of people spoke only English at home; the next most common languages were 0.7% Romanian, 0.6% Mandarin, 0.4% Spanish, 0.3% Russian, 0.3% German.

Education 
There are no schools in Windaroo. The nearest government primary school is Windaroo State School in neighbouring Mount Warren Park to the north. The nearest government secondary school is Windaroo Valley State High School in neighbouring Bahrs Scrub to the north-west.

Amenities
Windaroo Lakes Golf Club has an 18-hole golf course at 2 Johanna Place (corner of Anna Louise Terrace).

Windaroo Memorial Peace Park is at Carl Heck Boulevard. It contains the Windaroo Australian Peace Keepers Memorial.

There are a number of parks in the area:

 Kaiser Drive Park
 Rugby Union Club

References

External links

 *